Syllepte paucilinealis is a moth in the family Crambidae. It is found in Indonesia (Sulawesi).

References

Moths described in 1880
paucilinealis
Moths of Indonesia